David Armstrong McKay (born March 31, 1995) is an American professional baseball pitcher who is a free agent. He has previously played in MLB for the Seattle Mariners, Detroit Tigers, New York Yankees, and Tampa Bay Rays.

Early life and college
McKay attended and played baseball at Viera High School in Viera, Florida. He was selected by the New York Mets in the 30th round of the 2013 Major League Baseball draft out of high school but opted to attend Florida Atlantic University to play college baseball for the Florida Atlantic Owls instead. McKay played three seasons for the Owls, receiving a medical redshirt as a freshman after an injury cut his season short after two games. As a redshirt sophomore, McKay went 3-6 with 3.74 ERA and a team-leading 66 strikeouts and .222 batting average against in 74.2 innings pitched. In 2015, he pitched in summer college baseball with the Bethesda Big Train, tallying a 2.25 ERA in 20 innings.

Professional career

Kansas City Royals
McKay was selected by the Kansas City Royals in the 14th round, 433rd overall, of the 2016 MLB draft.

He played for the Burlington Royals in his debut season of 2016, accumulating a 3–3 record with a 2.64 ERA in 44 innings. He split 2017 between the Idaho Falls Chukars and the Lexington Legends, accumulating a 6–5 record with a 7.21 ERA in 88.2 innings.

Seattle Mariners
On March 20, 2018, McKay was traded to the Seattle Mariners in exchange for $1 in cash considerations. He split the 2018 season between the Modesto Nuts, the Arkansas Travelers, and the Tacoma Rainiers, accumulating a 6–2 record with a 2.58 ERA in 58 innings. McKay played for the Peoria Javelinas of the Arizona Fall League after the 2018 regular season.

On January 24, 2019, McKay was invited to major league spring training with the Mariners. McKay was called up to the majors for the first time on March 30, 2019. He was optioned to the Tacoma Rainiers on April 2, without appearing in a game. He was recalled to the major league roster on May 19, and made his debut on May 20 versus the Texas Rangers. During the 2019 season with Tacoma, McKay posted a 3–1 record, with a 5.15 ERA and 71 strikeouts in 30 appearances.

Detroit Tigers
On August 6, 2019, McKay was claimed off waivers by the Detroit Tigers. He was called up on August 14 and made his Tigers debut the next day against Seattle, the team he made his MLB debut with earlier in the season. In  innings, he struck out 29. On September 3, 2020, McKay was designated for assignment by the Tigers following the acquisition of Zack Short. McKay did not pitch during the 2021 season.

New York Yankees
On February 26, 2022, McKay signed a minor league deal with the Tampa Bay Rays. On April 4, he was traded to the New York Yankees in exchange for $1. The Yankees added McKay to their 40-man roster and optioned him to the Scranton/Wilkes-Barre RailRiders. The Yankees promoted McKay to the major leagues on May 22. The Yankees designated McKay for assignment on June 21.

Tampa Bay Rays
On June 23, 2022, the Yankees traded McKay back to the Rays for cash considerations. He was designated for assignment on July 9.

Oakland Athletics
On July 12, 2022, McKay was claimed off waivers by the Oakland Athletics. He was recalled on July 22. On September 1, McKay was designated for assignment. He was released on September 2, 2022.

References

External links

1995 births
Living people
People from Melbourne, Florida
Viera High School alumni
Baseball players from Florida
Major League Baseball pitchers
Seattle Mariners players
Detroit Tigers players
New York Yankees players
Tampa Bay Rays players
Oakland Athletics players
Florida Atlantic Owls baseball players
Burlington Royals players
Idaho Falls Chukars players
Lexington Legends players
Modesto Nuts players
Arkansas Travelers players
Tacoma Rainiers players
Toledo Mud Hens players
Peoria Javelinas players
Durham Bulls players
Scranton/Wilkes-Barre RailRiders players
Las Vegas Aviators players